James Archibald "Snowy" Atkinson (4 April 1896 – 11 June 1956) was an Australian rules footballer and first class cricketer.

Family
The son of Michael James Atkinson, and Margaret Atkinson, née Markland, James Archibald Atkinson was born in Fitzroy North, Victoria on 4 April 1896. He married Mary Agnes McLoughlin in 1919.

Football

Atkinson played his football with Fitzroy in the VFL from 1917 to 1925. He was a defender, and in 1922 was a member of Fitzroy's premiership side as well as winning their Club Champion award. Atkinson was club captain in 1924 and 1925.

He moved to Tasmania in 1926 and finished his footballing career with Lefroy. He represented Tasmania at the interstate football carnival in Melbourne in 1927. He broke "virtually every bone in his body" during his career, and his injuries finally forced him out of the game in 1930.

Cricket
In cricket, Atkinson played 26 first-class games for Victoria and Tasmania between 1921–22 and 1933–34. "Probably Tasmania's greatest cricket captain" in the years before it entered the Sheffield Shield, he led the team in 19 first-class matches from 1928–29 to 1932–33.

An opening batsman, in 1927-28 he carried his bat for 144 not out against Victoria, and in 1929-30 he did it again, with 104 not out. Nevertheless, Tasmania lost each time.

In the two matches against the touring MCC in 1928-29 he scored 17, 47, 20 and 30, the last three innings of which were Tasmania's top scores. Against the South Africans in 1931-32 he scored 90, 1, 48 and 55, again top-scoring three times.

The Oxford Companion to Australian Cricket described him as an "uncompromising opening batsman, capable of thunderous hooks and drives, as well as delicate late cuts, and a fine close-to-the-wicket fieldsman". In Tasmania's victory over Victoria in Melbourne in 1928-29 he took seven catches – five in the first innings and two in the second – as well as scoring 54, the second-highest score in the match.

Tasmanian Cricket Association record
Playing with the South Hobart Cricket Club in the Tasmanian Cricket Association (TCA) competition he scored 1,000 runs in four seasons out of five, including 1,000 runs in three successive seasons.

Publican
After he retired from senior club cricket in 1935 he became a publican in Launceston.

Death
He died at Beaconsfield, Tasmania on 11 June 1956.

See also
 1927 Melbourne Carnival
 List of Victoria first-class cricketers
 List of Tasmanian representative cricketers

Footnotes

References
 O'Neill, Pat, "When 'Snowy' Atkinson Got Even With Douglas Jardine", The Sporting Globe, (Saturday, 20 May 1939), p. 6.

External links
 
 
 Jim Atkinson, at Boyles Football Photos.
 Jim Atkinson page on Cricinfo
 Jim Atkinson at Cricket Archive

1896 births
1956 deaths
Fitzroy Football Club players
Fitzroy Football Club Premiership players
Mitchell Medal winners
Lefroy Football Club players
Tasmanian Football Hall of Fame inductees
People from Fitzroy, Victoria
Cricketers from Melbourne
Australian cricketers
Victoria cricketers
Tasmania cricketers
Australian rules footballers from Melbourne
One-time VFL/AFL Premiership players